The 1996 Montreal Alouettes finished in second place in the East Division with a 12–6 record in the franchise's first full season in the Canadian Football League since 1986.  Unlike the lean years from 1981–86, the revived Alouettes were going to be competitive, especially since most of them had won the Grey Cup in the previous season as the Baltimore Stallions. They had some nice talented offensive players from that team, such as Tracy Ham, Mike Pringle, kick returner Chris Wright, slotback Chris Armstrong, and two great defensive players in Irvin Smith, and Elfrid Payton. After a slow start they rebounded to finish strong and after defeating the Hamilton Tiger-Cats, they traveled to Toronto, where they were defeated in the East Final by the eventual Grey Cup champions, the Toronto Argonauts.

Offseason

Start of a new franchise
Starting in the 1993 CFL season, the league began expanding into the United States with hopes of boosting revenues and saw five US-based teams in 1995, including the dominant Baltimore Stallions. Prior to the 1996 NFL season, Cleveland Browns owner Art Modell, announced his intentions to move the Browns to Baltimore (to be reborn as the Ravens, meaning there would be two professional football teams in the city. Stallions owner Jim Speros realized that the Stallions could not realistically compete with an NFL team and decided to move the team elsewhere. He looked into moving the team to Houston, Texas (which would lose their NFL team, the Oilers by the end of that same year), but after a deal could not be resolved, he decided to move the team to Montreal as the third (and current) incarnation of the Alouettes.

Stallions General Manager Jim Popp came with Speros to Montreal, but he had to build the team from scratch since the CFL did not allow the team to retain its Baltimore legacy. It was, however, allowed to reclaim the history and records of the old 1946-86 Alouettes (and the Concordes from 1982-85). According to official CFL records, Speros is reckoned as having canceled the Stallions' franchise and reactivated the dormant Alouettes franchise. The Alouettes are now reckoned as having suspended operations from 1987 to 1995.

While all Baltimore players were released from their contracts, Popp was able to resign future Canadian Football Hall of Fame quarterback Tracy Ham and future Hall of Fame running back Mike Pringle, who would go on to become the CFL's all-time leading rusher. Both Ham and Pringle, along with other former Baltimore players re-signed by Popp, would play large roles in the success of the reborn team. The new Alouettes played their first regular season game on June 27, 1996; almost ten years since their last game in the city of Montreal.

CFL draft

Preseason

Regular season

Season Standings

Season Schedule

Roster

Playoffs

East Semi-Final

East Final

Awards

1996 CFL All-Star Selections
Grant Carter – Defensive End
Charles Gordon – Defensive Back
Tracy Gravely – Linebacker

1996 CFL East All-Star Selections
Terry Baker – Placekicker
Bruce Beaton – Offensive Guard
Grant carter – Defensive End
Jock Climie – Slotback
Neal Fort – Offensive Tackle
Charles gordon – Defensive Back
Tracy gravely – Linebacker
Spencer McLennan – Defensive Safety
Mike Pringle – Running Back
Paul Randolph – Linebacker
Irvin Smith – Cornerback

1996 Intergold CFLPA All-Star Selections

References

1996 Canadian Football League season by team
Montreal Alouettes seasons
1990s in Montreal
1996 in Quebec